Oakenshawe Historic District is a national historic district in Baltimore, Maryland, United States. It comprises 334 buildings which reflect the neighborhood's development during the period 1890 to about 1926. The neighborhood evolved in two stages on the 19th century Wilson estate. The first phase of growth is represented by frame houses dating from 1890 to about 1910 reflecting vernacular interpretations of the Victorian Gothic and Italianate styles.  The second stage of development began in the World War I era, when several developers transformed the property by constructing a neighborhood of brick "daylight" rowhouses in revival styles popular at the time.

It was added to the National Register of Historic Places in 2003.

References

External links
, including photo dated 2002, at Maryland Historical Trust
Boundary Map of the Oakenshawe Historic District, Baltimore City, at Maryland Historical Trust

See also
List of Baltimore neighborhoods

Historic districts on the National Register of Historic Places in Baltimore
Northern Baltimore